Iridium(III) sulfide is the inorganic compound with the formula Ir2S3.  It is an insoluble black solid, prepared by heating a mixture of elemental iridium and sulfur.  Crystals can be grown by chemical vapor transport using bromine as the transporting agent.  The structure consists of octahedral and tetrahedral Ir and S centers, respectively.  No close Ir-Ir contacts are observed. Rh2S3 and Rh2Se3 adopt the same structure.

References 

Sulfides
Iridium compounds